Ashley Darby (June 8, 1988) is an American television personality and singer. She gained notability after winning Miss District of Columbia in 2011 and has been a main cast member of The Real Housewives of Potomac since the show's inception in January 2016.

Early life and education 
Darby was raised by her single mother, Sheila Matthews, in Silver Spring, Maryland. She has two younger half-siblings:  musician/entrepreneur Zach Smith and high school student Jessica. As a teenager she often worked to help provide additional income for the family. Following high school graduation, Darby attended The University of Maryland and earned a degree in communications.

Career 
Since the show's creation, Darby has been a cast member of The Real Housewives of Potomac. Her first seasons focused extensively on her desire to have a child and efforts to successfully run the Australian-themed restaurant owned by herself and her husband, Oz. The restaurant floundered for nearly four years until its closure in June 2019.

In 2018, Darby released a single titled Coffee and Love produced by her brother.

Before joining the show, Darby worked as a bartender at one of her future husband's restaurants. In 2011, she was crowned Miss District of Columbia and went on to represent the District of Columbia in the Miss America competition.

Personal life 
Ashley Darby married Australian restaurateur and largescale realtor Michael Darby in May 2014.

She had her first son, Dean Michael Darby, on July 7, 2019. Darby was very public about her postpartum depression following her son's birth and shared she was experiencing "postpartum blues" within the first month.

Her second son, Dylan Matthew Darby, was born in March 2021.

The Darbys announced in April 2022 that they would be separating after almost eight years of marriage.

References 

Participants in American reality television series
1988 births
Living people
African-American women singers
African-American television personalities
People from Potomac, Maryland
People from Silver Spring, Maryland